Whatever Happened to Jugula? is the thirteenth studio album by English folk / rock singer-songwriter and guitarist Roy Harper. It was first released on March 4, 1985 through Beggars Banquet Records. Jimmy Page contributes.

History
With a working title of "Rizla", Whatever Happened to Jugula? was released on the Beggars Banquet label (BBL60) and reached the UK Top 20. It is recorded in a fresh and spontaneous manner, often with only the unique sound of Ovation guitars and vocals. Occasionally, the arrangements are filled with synthesizer and electric guitar. The album's cover art is based on an unravelled orange Rizla pack.

The album was partially recorded in the basement of an old school friend's house in Lytham. Boiler House Studios were run by Tony Beck who had encouraged Harper to renew his acquaintance with Jimmy Page. Together Harper and Page recorded at Page's house on an eight track Teac reel to reel borrowed from Pete Townshend. Page also visited Lytham and recordings were also made there.

'Jugula' exposed Harper to a new and wider audience through this connection to Jimmy Page, their appearances at the Cambridge Folk Festival in 1984, the album tour (of which four performances were filmed and exist on archive footage) and a 15-minute televised interview by Mark Ellen on the Old Grey Whistle Test (16 November 1984). The interview featured Harper and Page playing acoustic guitars on the side of Side Pike in the English Lake District, a somewhat different and unusual interview for the time. Songs played included "Hangman" and a section from "The Same Old Rock".
 
The album was the fifth that Harper and Page had worked on, but the first they had made together entirely. Page's guitar playing is quite evident throughout the album, and is a natural complement to Harper's unique guitar work. The first track, "Nineteen Forty-Eightish", a reference to George Orwell's Nineteen Eighty-Four, crescendos with lead guitar by Page. Other tracks include "Hangman", a song that expresses the feelings of an innocent man condemned to die and "Frozen Moment", a song played entirely in the chord of C.

The track "Hope" originated as a tune written by David Gilmour for his second solo album About Face. He asked Pete Townshend to supply lyrics, but felt that he couldn't relate to them, so Townshend used the song instead entitling it "White City Fighting", with Gilmour playing guitar, on his album White City: A Novel. Gilmour sent the same tune to Harper, whose lyrics had the same effect on Gilmour. Harper used the result, "Hope", which has a markedly slower tempo, on this album, with his son Nick Harper (16 years old at the time), playing lead guitar.

"Hangman" is about the feelings of an innocent man condemned to be executed for a crime he did not commit. Of capital punishment Harper stated:

Reissues
In 1999 the album was reissued on Harper's own 'Science Friction' label and retitled Jugula, the cover art being altered accordingly. In 2019, the album was remastered and reissued, maintaining the later 1999 artwork.

Singles 

"Elizabeth", a song that originally appeared on Harper's 1984 release Born in Captivity, was re-recorded and released as a 12" single. Again the artwork was based on an unfolded Rizla packet, this time in green. The 12" was released on Beggars Banquet Records (BEG 131T).

Side A – "Elizabeth"
Side B –
 "Advertisement (Another Intentional Irrelevant Suicide)"
 "I Hate The White Man" (Live) (Recorded at Poynton, 18 October 1984)

Cover version
A cover version of "Hope" (with "Bad Speech" read by Harper as an introduction) can be found on the album Eternity by the Liverpudlian band Anathema.

Track listing

Personnel 
Roy Harper – vocals, acoustic and electric guitars, percussion
Jimmy Page – acoustic and electric guitars
Tony Franklin – bass guitar
Nik Green – keyboards, engineering
Ronnie Brambles – drums
Steve Broughton – drums
Preston Heyman – drums
Nick Harper – semi-acoustic guitar

Charts

References

Roy Harper (singer) albums
1985 albums
Jimmy Page albums
Beggars Banquet Records albums
Collaborative albums